Sassafras is a genus of three extant and one extinct species of deciduous trees in the family Lauraceae, native to eastern North America and eastern Asia. The genus is distinguished by its aromatic properties, which have made the tree useful to humans.

Description 
All parts of the plants are fragrant. The species are unusual in having three distinct leaf patterns on the same plant: unlobed oval, bilobed (mitten-shaped), and trilobed (three-pronged); the leaves are hardly ever five-lobed. Three-lobed leaves are more common in Sassafras tzumu and S. randaiense than in their North American counterparts, although three-lobed leaves sometimes occur on S. albidum. The young leaves and twigs are quite mucilaginous and produce a citrus-like scent when crushed. The tiny, yellow flowers are generally six-petaled; S. albidum and (the extinct) S. hesperia are dioecious, with male and female flowers on separate trees, while S. tzumu and S. randaiense have male and female flowers occurring on the same trees. The fruit is a drupe, blue-black when ripe.

Taxonomy 
The genus Sassafras was first described by the Bohemian botanist Jan Presl in 1825. The name "sassafras", applied by the botanist Nicolas Monardes in 1569, comes from the French . Some sources claim it originates from the Latin  or : "stone-breaking";  "rock" +  "to break"). Sassafras trees are not within the family Saxifragaceae.

Early European colonists reported that the plant was called winauk by Native Americans in Delaware and Virginia and pauane by the Timucua. Native Americans distinguished between white sassafras and red sassafras, terms which referred to different parts of the same plant but with distinct colors and uses.  Sassafras was known as fennel wood (German ) due to its distinctive aroma.

Species 
The genus Sassafras includes four species, three extant and one extinct. Sassafras plants are endemic to North America and East Asia, with two species in each region that are distinguished by some important characteristics, including the frequency of three-lobed leaves (more frequent in East Asian species) and aspects of their sexual reproduction (North American species being dioecious).

Taiwanese sassafras, Taiwan, is treated by some botanists in a distinct genus as Yushunia randaiensis (Hayata) Kamikoti, though this is not supported by recent genetic evidence, which shows Sassafras to be monophyletic.

North America 

Sassafras albidum (Nuttall) Nees – sassafras, white sassafras, red sassafras, or silky sassafras, eastern North America, from southernmost Ontario, Canada through the eastern United States, south to central Florida, and west to southern Iowa and East Texas, formerly, Wisconsin
†Sassafras hesperia (Berry) – western North American, from the Eocene Klondike Mountain Formation of Washington and British Columbia; extinct, known only from fossils.

East Asia 
Sassafras tzumu (Hemsl.) Hemsl. – Chinese sassafras or tzumu, central and southwestern China
Sassafras randaiense (Hayata) Rehd. – Taiwan

Distribution and habitat 
Many Lauraceae are aromatic, evergreen trees or shrubs adapted to high rainfall and humidity, but the genus Sassafras is deciduous. Deciduous sassafras trees lose all of their leaves for part of the year, depending on variations in rainfall. In deciduous tropical Lauraceae, leaf loss coincides with the dry season in tropical, subtropical and arid regions.

Sassafras is commonly found in open woods, along fences, or in fields. It grows well in moist, well-drained, or sandy loam soils and tolerates a variety of soil types, attaining a maximum in southern and wetter areas of distribution.

Sassafras albidum ranges from southern Maine and southern Ontario west to Iowa, and south to central Florida and eastern Texas, in North America. S. tzumu may be found in Anhui, Fujian, Guangdong, Guangxi, Guizhou, Hubei, Hunan, Jiangsu, Sichuan, Yunnan, and Zhejiang, China. S. randaiense is native to Taiwan.

Ecology 

The leaves, bark, twigs, stems, and fruits are eaten by birds and mammals in small quantities. For most animals, sassafras is not consumed in large enough quantities to be important, although it is an important deer food in some areas. Carey and Gill rate its value to wildlife as fair, their lowest rating. Sassafras leaves and twigs are consumed by white-tailed deer and porcupines. Other sassafras leaf browsers include groundhogs, marsh rabbits, and American black bears. Rabbits eat sassafras bark in winter. American beavers will cut sassafras stems.  Sassafras fruits are eaten by many species of birds, including bobwhite quail, eastern kingbirds, great crested flycatchers, phoebes, wild turkeys, gray catbirds, northern flickers, pileated woodpeckers, downy woodpeckers, thrushes, vireos, and northern mockingbirds. Some small mammals also consume sassafras fruits.

Toxicity
Sassafras oil contains safrole, which may have a carcinogenic effect.

Uses
All parts of sassafras plants, including roots, stems, twig leaves, bark, flowers, and fruit, have been used for culinary, medicinal, and aromatic purposes, both in areas where they are endemic and in areas where they were imported, such as Europe. The wood of sassafras trees has been used as a material for building ships and furniture in China, Europe, and the United States, and sassafras played an important role in the history of the European colonization of the Americas in the 16th and 17th centuries. Sassafras twigs have been used as toothbrushes and fire starters.

Culinary

Sassafras albidum is an important ingredient in some distinct foods of the US. It is the main ingredient in traditional root beer and sassafras root tea, and ground leaves of sassafras are a distinctive additive in Louisiana Creole cuisine. It is used in filé powder, a common thickening and flavoring agent in gumbo. Methods of cooking with sassafras combine this ingredient native to America with traditional North American, as well as European, culinary techniques, to create a unique blend of Creole cuisine, and are thought by some to be heavily influenced by a blend of cultures. Sassafras is no longer used in commercially produced root beer since sassafras oil was banned for use in commercially mass-produced foods and drugs by the US Food and Drug Administration in 1960 due to health concerns about the carcinogenicity of safrole, a major constituent of sassafras oil, in animal studies.

Sassafras leaves and flowers have also been used in salads, and to flavor fats or cure meats. The young twigs can also be eaten fresh or dried. Additionally, the subterranean portion of the plant can be peeled, dried and boiled to make tea.

Traditional medicine
Numerous Native American tribes used the leaves of sassafras to treat wounds by rubbing the leaves directly into a wound and used different parts of the plant for many medicinal purposes such as treating acne, urinary disorders, and sicknesses that increased body temperature, such as high fevers. East Asian types of sassafras such as S. tzumu (chu mu) and S. randaiense (chu shu) are used in Chinese medicine to treat rheumatism and trauma. Some modern researchers conclude that the oil, roots and bark of sassafras have analgesic and antiseptic properties. Different parts of the sassafras plant (including the leaves and stems, the bark, and the roots) have been used to treat scurvy, skin sores, kidney problems, toothaches, rheumatism, swelling, menstrual disorders, sexually transmitted diseases, bronchitis, hypertension, and dysentery. It is also used as a fungicide, dentifrice, rubefacient, diaphoretic, perfume, carminative and sudorific. Before the twentieth century, Sassafras enjoyed a great reputation in the medical literature, but became valued for its power to improve the flavor of other medicines.

Sassafras root was an early export from North America, as early as 1609.

Sassafras wood and oil were both used in dentistry. Early toothbrushes were crafted from sassafras twigs or wood because of its aromatic properties. Sassafras was also used as an early dental anesthetic and disinfectant.

Wood 
Sassafras albidum is often grown as an ornamental tree for its unusual leaves and aromatic scent. Outside of its native area, it is occasionally cultivated in Europe and elsewhere. The durable and beautiful wood of sassafras plants has been used in shipbuilding and furniture-making in North America, in Asia, and in Europe (once Europeans were introduced to the plant). Sassafras wood was also used by Native Americans in the southeastern United States as a fire-starter because of the flammability of its natural oils found within the wood and the leaves.

Oil and aroma 
Steam distillation of dried root bark produces an essential oil which has a high safrole content, as well as significant amounts of varying other chemicals such as camphor, eugenol (including 5-methoxyeugenol), asarone, and various sesquiterpenes.  Many other trees contain similarly high percentages and their extracted oils are sometimes referred to as sassafras oil, which once was extensively used as a fragrance in perfumes and soaps, food and for aromatherapy.  Safrole is a precursor for the clandestine manufacture of the drugs MDA and MDMA, and as such, sales and import of sassafras oil (as a safrole-containing mixture of above-threshold concentration) are heavily restricted in the US.

Sassafras oil has also been used as a natural insect or pest deterrent, and in liqueurs (such as the opium-based Godfrey's), and in homemade liquor to mask strong or unpleasant smells. Sassafras oil has also been added to soap and other toiletries.  It is banned in the United States for use in commercially mass-produced foods and drugs by the FDA as a potential carcinogen.

Commercial use
For a more detailed description of uses by indigenous peoples of North America, and a history of the commercial use of Sassafras albidum by Europeans in the United States in the 16th and 17th centuries, see the article on the extant North American species of sassafras, Sassafras albidum.

In modern times, the sassafras plant has been grown and harvested for the extraction of sassafras oil.  It is used in a variety of commercial products or their syntheses, such as the insecticide synergistic compound piperonyl butoxide.  These plants are primarily harvested for commercial purposes in Asia and Brazil.

References

External links 

 U of Arkansas: Division of Agriculture Plant of the Week: Sassafras
 GardenGuides.com Sassafras – Shrub Plant Guide
 Plants for a Future: Plant Portrait – Sassafras albidum
 TVA: Native Plant – Sassafras
 Missouri Plants – Sassafras albidum
 The Jefferson Monticello: The Lucy Meriwether Lewis Marks exhibit – article by Wendy Cortesi
 FossilMuseum.net: Rare Sassafras Plant Fossils
US Forest Service

Lauraceae genera
Medicinal plants
Non-timber forest products
Lauraceae